The Sd.Kfz. 6 (Sonderkraftfahrzeug 6) was a half-track military vehicle used by the German Wehrmacht during the Second World War. It was designed to be used as the main towing vehicle for the 10.5 cm leFH 18 howitzer.

Development 
Development of a new medium artillery tractor began in 1934 at Büssing-NAG, in Berlin. The vehicle, produced in around 750 units until 1942, could carry up to 11 men in three rows, covered by a canvas structure. As well as a tractor for the 10.5 leFH 18 howitzer, the vehicle was to be used to tow heavy equipment for engineer units. Production was carried out by both Büssing-NAG and Daimler-Benz.

Description 
Sd.Kfz. 6 was used by the various German military forces (Wehrmacht, SS, Luftwaffe) for the entire World War II.

Variants 
 Sd.Kfz. 6/1: Standard half-tracked vehicle, used for towing various artillery pieces and transporting anything up to fifteen people.
 37 mm FlaK36 auf Fahrgestell Zugkraftwagen 5t (Sd.Kfz. 6/2): Sd.Kfz. 6 fitted with a 3.7 cm Flak 36 anti-aircraft gun, sides would fold down to allow space to work on. Crew of seven.
 7.62 cm FK 296(r) Selbstfahrlafette auf Zugkraftwagen 5t (Sd.Kfz. 6/3). Sd.Kfz. 6 carrying a captured Soviet 76mm F-22 gun portee in an armoured superstructure.

Sources

Bibliography

External links 

 "Tractors Haul Artillery In Mechanized Army" Popular Mechanics, August 1937 – excellent photo of early Sd.Kfz. 6s on parade
 Technical data of Sd.Kfz. 6

World War II armoured fighting vehicles of Germany
World War II half-tracks
Half-tracks of Germany
Military vehicles introduced in the 1930s